Strictly Diesel is the debut album by the American industrial metal band Spineshank. It was released on September 22, 1998 by Roadrunner Records, it sold 75,000 units in the U.S.

Track listing

Personnel
 Jonny Santos – vocals
 Mike Sarkisyan – guitar, sitar, co-producer
 Robert Garcia – bass, backing vocals
 Tommy Decker – drums, electronics, backing vocals, co-producer
 Josh Abraham - programming, loops, electronics
 Amir Derakh - synth guitar on "While My Guitar Gently Weeps"
 Chris Thompson - extra guitar on "Stain (Start the Machine)"
 Burton C. Bell - guest vocal on "Stain (Start the Machine)"

Chart positions

Album

References

1998 debut albums
Spineshank albums
Roadrunner Records albums
Albums produced by Jay Baumgardner